is a Japanese professional wrestler, better known for his ring name . He has worked in Toryumon and Michinoku Pro Wrestling, but is more famous for his long career in Osaka Pro Wrestling. Along with Kikutaro and Stalker Ichikawa, he is considered one of the greatest three comedy wrestlers in Japan.

Career

Toryumon (2004–2006) 
Watanabe trained in the Último Dragón Gym and graduated in the 13 Toryumon school class term, debuting in Toryumon Mexico in 2004 against Small Dandy Fujii. He adopted the gimmick of Kanjyuro Matsuyama, a flamboyant, kumadori-wearing kabuki actor. Matsuyama still competed in Mexico until 2006, teaming up with Milanito Collection a.t. and wrestling in low profile matches. In 2005, however, he was sent to Chikara as a Toryumon representative, accompanying his master Skayde and trying to apply for the Young Lions Cup before being eliminated by Icarus. Upon his return to Toryumon, he left for Japan and never came back to Mexico.

Michinoku Pro Wrestling (2006–2007) 
He started working in Michinoku Pro Wrestling in October 2006, teaming with The Great Sasuke to compete in the Futaritabi Tag Team Tournament, although only to be eliminated at the first round by Osaka Pro Wrestling representatives Ebessan and Kuishinbo Kamen. Afterwards, he feuded with Otoko Sakari, having a series of five matches which Matsuyama won by 4-3. Watanabe oscillated between MPW and Osaka Pro Wrestling through 2007, until he settled down in Osaka Pro in 2007.

Osaka Pro Wrestling (2007–2014) 
Matsuyama was a mainstay of Osaka Pro Wrestling until 2014, when he left the promotion. He continued making sporadic appearances over the years.

He currently runs Matsuyamaza Pro Wrestling, which is based out of Osaka, Japan and hosts many top Japanese wrestling stars from the past and present, as well as international pro wrestlers.

Championships and accomplishments
Dramatic Dream Team 
Ironman Heavymetalweight Championship (1 time)

Osaka Pro Wrestling
Osaka Pro Wrestling Battle Royal Championship (1 time)
Osaka Meibutsu Sekaiichi Championship (1 time)
Osaka Pro Wrestling Owarai Championship (3 times)
UWA World Trios Championship (1 time) - with Ebessan III & Kuishinbo Kamen
FM Osaka Cup 1 Day Six Man Tag Tournament (2009) - with Ebessan III & Kuishinbo Kamen

Luchas de Apuestas record

References

1984 births
Japanese male professional wrestlers
Living people
21st-century professional wrestlers
UWA World Trios Champions
Ironman Heavymetalweight Champions